SuperTerminal 1 is the largest multi-level air cargo terminal in the world located at southeast corner of the Hong Kong International Airport in Chek Lap Kok, New Territories, Hong Kong. It is now owned and operated by Hong Kong Air Cargo Terminals Limited (HACTL).

It was designed by British architect Sir Norman Foster and built in 1998. The building cost US$1 billion and can handle  of cargo per year.

References

External links
HACTL SuperTerminal 1
Air Cargo Containers Types

Transport infrastructure completed in 1998
Chek Lap Kok
Air cargo terminals